Mifsud is a surname of Maltese origin. It may refer to:

Adrian Mifsud (born 1974), Maltese footballer
Anthony J. Mifsud, Maltese-Canadian actor, singer and songwriter who performs as Mif
Carmelo Mifsud Bonnici (born 1960), Maltese politician, son of Ugo Mifsud Bonnici
Daniel Mifsud (born 1983), Australian Idol contestant
George Mifsud Chircop (1951-2007), Maltese linguist
Giuseppe Mifsud Bonnici (1930-2019), Maltese Chief Justice and philosopher
Immanuel Mifsud (born 1967), Maltese writer
Jean Pierre Mifsud Triganza (born 1981), Maltese footballer
Josef Mifsud (born 1984), Maltese footballer
Joseph Mifsud (born 1960), Maltese academic
Karmenu Mifsud Bonnici (born 1933), former Prime Minister of Malta
Ludovik Mifsud Tommasi (1796-1879), Maltese priest, educator and poet
Michael Mifsud (born 1981), Maltese footballer
Paul Mifsud, Maltese snooker player
Paula Mifsud Bonnici, member of Parliament of Malta (2013-2017)
Philip Mifsud (born 1971), Maltese architect and politician
Sigmund Mifsud, Maltese musician and conductor
Stéphane Mifsud (born 1971), French free-diver
Steve Mifsud (born 1972), Australian snooker player
Ugo Mifsud Bonnici (born 1932), former President of Malta
Ugo Pasquale Mifsud (1889-1932), former Prime Minister of Malta